Walter Jeremiah Maddock (September 13, 1880January 25, 1951) was an American politician in North Dakota, US. He served in the North Dakota House of Representatives from 1915 to 1923, and became the 14th Lieutenant Governor of North Dakota in 1925. Me became the 15th Governor of North Dakota in 1928 when Arthur G. Sorlie died in office. He was the first governor born in what would eventually become North Dakota.

He was born in Grand Forks, Dakota Territory. He was educated at Northwestern Business College in Grand Forks, North Dakota.  He was married on October 30, 1906, to Margarite Tierney. They had five children: Wallace, Jerome, Dore R. V., Bernard, and Margarite.

Career
Maddock's first involvement with politics was as one of the founders of the Nonpartisan League.  He was a member of the North Dakota House of Representatives from 1915 through 1923.  He became the Lieutenant Governor in 1925, and upon the death of Governor Sorlie, he assumed the governorship in 1928.  He served the remainder of Sorlie's term and sought re-election, but he failed to win the race against George F. Shafer. In the 1928 election, he took the unusual step of switching parties from Republican to Democratic.

After being defeated in the election, Maddock returned to farming and was active in organizing farmers' cooperatives. He was a very strong supporter of the Nonpartisan League, and he also supported two state-owned industries, the Bank of North Dakota and the State Mill and Elevator. In 1933, he became the senior administrative officer of the regional Agricultural Adjustment Administration. From 1937 until his retirement in 1950, he served as the head of North Dakota's Farm Security Administration office.

Death
Maddock died on January 25, 1951, and is buried in Saint Mary's Cemetery, Bismarck, Burleigh County, North Dakota US.

References

External links
Walter J. Maddock's biography from the Historical Society of North Dakota website
Walter Maddock entry at the National Governors Association
Walter Jeremiah Maddock entry at The Political Graveyard

1880 births
1951 deaths
Governors of North Dakota
Lieutenant Governors of North Dakota
Members of the North Dakota House of Representatives
North Dakota Republicans
Politicians from Grand Forks, North Dakota
North Dakota Democrats
Nonpartisan League state governors of the United States
Republican Party governors of North Dakota
20th-century American politicians